Olfactomedin-like protein 3 is a protein that in humans is encoded by the OLFML3 gene. It has been shown to act as a proangiongenic factor in the tumor microenvironment, being released by endothelial cells and pericytes.

References

Further reading

Olfactomedins